Tephraciura oborinia is a species of tephritid or fruit flies in the genus Tephraciura of the family Tephritidae.

Distribution
Congo, Uganda, Rwanda, Zambia, Malawi, Lesotho, South Africa.

References

Tephritinae
Insects described in 1849
Diptera of Africa